American actress Doris Day consists of 39 feature films released between 1948 and 1968. Day began her career as a band singer, and eventually won the female lead in a Warner Bros. film, Romance on the High Seas (1948), for which she was selected by Michael Curtiz to replace Betty Hutton. She went on to star in several minor musicals for Warner Bros., including Tea for Two (1950), Lullaby of Broadway (1951), April in Paris (1952), By the Light of the Silvery Moon (1953) and the hit musical Calamity Jane, in which she performed the Academy Award-winning song "Secret Love" (1953). She ended her contract with Warner Bros. after filming Young at Heart (1954) with Frank Sinatra.

Day's portrayal of singer Ruth Etting in Love Me or Leave Me (1955) with James Cagney was well received by critics and was a box-office hit. She also appeared in Alfred Hitchcock's remake of The Man Who Knew Too Much (1956), Andrew L. Stone's Julie (1956) and George Abbott and Stanley Donen's The Pajama Game (1957).

Day appeared with Rock Hudson and Tony Randall in three films: Pillow Talk (1959), Lover Come Back (1961) and Send Me No Flowers (1964). She ranked No. 1 at the box office in 1960 and again from 1962 until 1964. Day went on to star in several other romantic comedies, including That Touch of Mink (1962) with Cary Grant, The Thrill of It All and Move Over, Darling (both 1963), both with James Garner. After the failure of Do Not Disturb in 1965, Day's film career began to decline. She last ranked as a top-ten box-office star in 1966 with the hit film The Glass Bottom Boat.

Her final films Caprice, The Ballad of Josie (both 1967), Where Were You When the Lights Went Out? and With Six You Get Eggroll (both 1968) were critical flops but achieved reasonable success at the box office. She turned down the role of Mrs. Robinson in The Graduate, a role that eventually went to Anne Bancroft. In her published memoirs, Day said she had rejected the part on moral grounds: she found the script "vulgar and offensive".

When her film career ended, Day turned to television with her situation comedy The Doris Day Show (1968–1973), which ran for five seasons and 128 episodes, and made several other television appearances throughout the 1970s and 1980s. Day, an animal lover, launched the series Doris Day's Best Friends (1985–1986), which ran for 26 episodes. She was an honoree at The 50th Annual Grammy Awards in 2008.
, and was last seen in archive footage in the 2009 documentary What a Difference a Day Made: Doris Day Superstar.

Film appearances

Television appearances

The 21st Annual Academy Awards (1949; TV special)
The Bob Hope Show (1950; 1 episode)
Screen Snapshots: Hollywood Night Life (1952; short)
Screen Snapshots: Hollywood on the Ball (1952; short)
So You Want a Television Set (cameo) (1953; short)
A Star Is Born World Premiere (1954; short)
What's My Line? (1954; mystery guest)
The Ed Sullivan Show (1956; 2 episodes)
What's My Line? (1957; mystery guest)
The 30th Annual Academy Awards (1958, co-presenter; TV special)
This Is Music (1958; 1 episode)
The 31st Annual Academy Awards (1959, co-presenter; TV special)
The 32nd Annual Academy Awards (1960, co-presenter/nominee; TV special)
Every Girl's Dream (1966; short)
The Doris Day Show (1968-1973; 128 episodes) Golden Globe nomination.
The Merv Griffin Show (1970; 1 episode)
The Governor & J.J. (1970; 1 episode)
The Doris Mary Ann Kappelhoff Special (1971; TV special)
The Pet Set (1971; 1 episode)
The Merv Griffin Show (1973; 1 episode)
The Tonight Show Starring Johnny Carson (1973; 1 episode)
AFI Life Achievement Award: A Tribute to James Cagney (1974; TV special)
The John Denver Show (1974; 1 episode)
The Tonight Show Starring Johnny Carson (1974; 1 episode)
The Tonight Show Starring Johnny Carson (1975; 1 episode)
Doris Day Today (1975; CBS TV special)<ref name=IMDbToday>{{IMDb title|0313992|Doris Day Today (TV special, Feb. 19, 1975)}}</ref>The Mike Douglas Show (1976; 1 episode)Doris Day's Best Friends (1985–1986; 26 episodes)The 46th Annual Golden Globe Awards (1989, winner; TV special)Doris Day: A Sentimental Journey (1991; TV documentary)Vicki! (1993, 1 episode)Homeward Bound (1994; TV documentary)Don't Pave Main Street: Carmel's Heritage (1994, Narrator; documentary)Pebble Mill at One (1995; 1 episode)The Doris Day Story: Everybody's Darling (1998; TV special)A&E Biography: Doris Day (1998, archive footage)The 50th Annual Grammy Awards (2008, honoree; TV special)What a Difference a Day Made: Doris Day Superstar (2009, voice only; documentary)

Bibliography

 Santopietro, Tom (2007). Considering Doris Day''. Thomas Dunne Books, St. Martin's Press. Emphasis is more on body of work than on her personal life.
DeVita, Michael (2012). "My 'Secret Love' Affair with Doris Day." Create space (Amazon). . Emphasis on a meeting followed by 65+ years of correspondence. Special emphasis on the incredible Doris music.

References

F
Day, Doris
Day, Doris